The  Roman Catholic Diocese of Bragança–Miranda, in the north-east of Portugal, is a suffragan of the archdiocese of Braga. Its seats are the Cathedral of Braganza and the Co-Cathedral of Miranda do Douro.

History

thumb|left|200px|The Co-Cathedral of Miranda do Douro, the seat of the bishop until 1770.
The see was created in 1545 by Pope Paul III in the town of Miranda do Douro bordering on Spain, its territory being taken from the Archdiocese of Braga. Pope Clement XIV transferred the episcopal seat to Bragança in 1770.

José Manuel Garcia Cordeiro is the current bishop, nominated in July 2011 by  Pope Benedict XVI.
 The previous bishop (2001–2011) was Bishop António Montes Moreira.

Notes

Braganca
Braganca-Miranda, Roman Catholic Diocese of

de:Liste der Bischöfe von Bragança-Miranda